Itamar Batista da Silva (born April 12, 1980, in Santa Maria de Itabira, Minas Gerais, Brazil), known as just Itamar, is a Brazilian football player. His previous clubs include Chiapas, Seongnam Ilhwa Chunma, Suwon Samsung Bluewings, Pohang Steelers, Chunnam Dragons, Tigres UANL, Flamengo and Ceará Sporting Club. Itamar spent a total of five years in South Korea, playing for four clubs before it was announced in January 2008 that Chiapas of Mexico acquired the player. In his first season, he scored 12 goals in 18 games. In January 2011 Itamar moved to Al Rayyan Sports Club in Qatar on loan from Tigres UANL. He then signed with Brazilian club América-RN.

Club career

Club career statistics

External links
 

1980 births
Living people
Association football forwards
Brazilian footballers
Brazilian expatriate footballers
Cruzeiro Esporte Clube players
Club Athletico Paranaense players
Goiás Esporte Clube players
Sociedade Esportiva Palmeiras players
São Paulo FC players
Jeonnam Dragons players
Pohang Steelers players
Suwon Samsung Bluewings players
Seongnam FC players
Chiapas F.C. footballers
Tigres UANL footballers
CR Flamengo footballers
Ceará Sporting Club players
Al-Rayyan SC players
Campeonato Brasileiro Série A players
K League 1 players
Liga MX players
Expatriate footballers in South Korea
Expatriate footballers in Mexico
Sportspeople from Minas Gerais
Brazilian expatriate sportspeople in South Korea
Brazilian expatriate sportspeople in Mexico
Qatar Stars League players